The dinar is the principal currency unit in several countries near the Mediterranean Sea, and its historical use is even more widespread. The English word "dinar" is the transliteration of the Arabic دينار (dīnār), which was borrowed via the Syriac dīnarā, itself from the Latin dēnārius.

History 

The modern dinar's historical antecedents are the gold dinar and the silver dirham, the main coin of the medieval Islamic empires, first issued in AH 77 (696–697 CE) by Caliph Abd al-Malik ibn Marwan.  The word "dinar" derives from the Latin "dēnārius," a silver coin of ancient Rome, which was first minted about c. 211 BCE.

The Kushan Empire introduced a gold coin known as the dīnāra in India in the 1st century AD; the Gupta Empire and its successors up to the 6th century adopted the coin.

The 8th century English king Offa of Mercia minted copies of Abbasid dinars struck in 774 by Caliph Al-Mansur with "Offa Rex" centred on the reverse. The moneyer likely had no understanding of Arabic as the Arabic text contains many errors. Such coins may have been produced for trade with Islamic Spain. These coins are called a Mancus, which is also derived from the Arabic language.

Legal tender

Countries with current usage 
Countries currently using a currency called "dinar" or similar:

Countries with former usage 
Countries and regions which have previously used a currency called "dinar" in the 20th century:

See also

 Economy of the Organisation of Islamic Cooperation
 Kelantanese dinar
 Islamic State dinar
 List of circulating currencies
 Middle East economic integration

References

External links

 
 Malaysia: Kelantan collects Zakat in Shariah money

 
Denominations (currency)
Islamic banking
Islamic banking and finance terminology
Modern obsolete currencies